Bosara errabunda is a moth in the family Geometridae. It is found in Taiwan, Hong Kong and Hainan.

References

Moths described in 1958
Eupitheciini
Moths of Asia